Lesbian, gay, bisexual, and transgender (LGBT) rights in Bonaire are very progressive by Caribbean standards. Bonaire forms part of the Caribbean Netherlands and is a special municipalitiy of the Netherlands. Both male and female same-sex sexual activity are legal in Bonaire, with same-sex marriage and adoption being legal since 2012. In addition, discrimination on the basis of "heterosexual and homosexual orientation" is outlawed.

Law regarding same-sex sexual activity
Same-sex sexual activity is legal in Bonaire.

Recognition of same-sex relationships

Same-sex marriage in Bonaire became legal following the entry into force of a law enabling same-sex couples to marry there on 10 October 2012.

The first same-sex marriage occurred on 18 May 2013 between an Aruban and a Venezuelan national.

Discrimination protections
The Criminal Code BES, which applies to Bonaire and the islands of Saba and Sint Eustatius, criminalizes discrimination on the basis of "heterosexual and homosexual orientation". Article 144 provides for penalties varying from fines to two years' imprisonment.

In addition, Article 1 of the Constitution of the Netherlands applies to Bonaire. The article reads "All persons in the Netherlands shall be treated equally in equal
circumstances. Discrimination on the grounds of religion, belief, political opinion, race or sex or on any other grounds whatsoever shall not be permitted."

The Netherlands Institute for Human Rights (College voor de Rechten van de Mens) is a research institute which "protects, advances and monitors human rights". The Institute, established by law in 2010, works in the European Netherlands and also in the Caribbean Netherlands.

Living conditions
Due to Bonaire's small population of less than 20,000, there is no gay scene on the island. There are no specific gay venues or bars, though many do advocate as being "gay-friendly" and welcoming. There is, however, one gay association, known as EQ Bonaire. The group aims to "promote social reforms thereby achieving social acceptance of homosexuality".

Anti-gay discrimination is almost unheard of in Bonaire, but bullying and homophobia in schools is a big issue, and some local LGBT people have claimed that societal rejection, particularly directed at locals, not tourists, does exist.

Summary table

See also

LGBT rights in the Netherlands
LGBT rights in the Americas
LGBT rights in Sint Eustatius
LGBT rights in Saba
Same-sex marriage in Bonaire, Sint Eustatius and Saba

References